Allá en el trapiche is a Colombian comedy film, released in 1943. It was directed by the Chilean director Roberto Saa Silva from a script by Gabriel Martinez, and starred Colombian actors such as Lily Alvarez, Tocayo Ceballos, Soledad Sierra and Humberto Onetto. An early example of a domestic sound film at a time when such productions were rare in Colombia, Allá en el trapiche was a conscious attempt to recreate the success of the megahit Mexican film Allá en el rancho grande, which itself belonged to the widely popular Mexican genre called "ranchera comedy" (comedia ranchera mexicana).

References

1943 films
Colombian comedy films